The 2022 European Judo Championships was held in Sofia, Bulgaria, from 29 April to 1 May 2022.

Event videos
The event will air freely on the IJF YouTube channel.

Medal summary

Medal table

Men's events

Women's events

Participating nations
A total of  competitors from  nations were set to participate.

References

External links
 
 Results

 
European Judo Championships
European Championships
European Championships
Judo
Judo
European Judo Championships
European Judo Championships
European Judo Championships
Judo in Bulgaria
Judo